Duplex horakae is a moth of the family Erebidae first described by Michael Fibiger in 2010. It is known from the northern parts of Australia's Northern Territory and the north-eastern part of the state of Western Australia.

The wingspan is 7.5–9 mm. The crosslines are all present and black. The antemedial line is prominent and sharply angled subcostally. The subterminal line is prominent and waved. The terminal line is marked by dense black interneural spots. The hindwing is light grey, without a discal spot and the underside of the forewing is dark grey, while the underside of the hindwing is grey, with an indistinct discal spot.

References

Micronoctuini
Taxa named by Michael Fibiger
Moths described in 2010